Running Wild with Bear Grylls is a survival skills reality television series starring Bear Grylls. In each episode, Grylls brings a different celebrity along on his adventures. The crew consists of host Bear Grylls, a story producer, two camera cinematographers, two field recordists, and a mountain guide. Celebrities such as Zac Efron, Channing Tatum, and Ben Stiller made appearances on the first season of the show. In season 2, Kate Winslet, Michael B. Jordan, Kate Hudson, Michelle Rodriguez, James Marsden, and then sitting President Obama appeared. The series' fourth season premiered on May 7, 2018. Grylls announced on October 27, 2018 that they will begin filming for a fifth season. In February 2019, it was announced that the show would be moving to National Geographic for its fifth season which premiered on November 5, 2019.

Description
The show is based on the same survivalist concept as the rest of Grylls shows, such as Man vs. Wild, but with a celebrity joining him for the journey. The journeys include skydiving into the Catskill Mountains and climbing the cliffs in Utah.

Season one began July 28, 2014 and ended September 8, 2014, receiving generally good reviews that improved week by week. For three weeks it was the highest rated unscripted new show of the summer. A second season was announced on March 26, 2015 and began airing in July 2015.

On August 31, 2015, NBC and the White House announced that President Barack Obama will appear as a guest, hike through Exit Glacier and discuss conservation as well as the impact of climate change on the Alaska wilderness.

Series overview

Season 1 (2014)

Season 2 (2015)

Season 3 (2016–2017)

Season 4 (2018)

Season 5 (2019)
The series premiered its fifth season on its new home network, National Geographic, on November 5, 2019. Guest celebrities featured include Alex Honnold, Armie Hammer, Brie Larson, Cara Delevingne, Dave Bautista, Zachary Quinto and returning season 1 guest Channing Tatum, among others, with locations including Iceland, Sardinia, Panama, Arizona and Utah.

Season 6 (2021)

Season 7: The Challenge (2022)

French version
A French version of Running Wild with Bear Grylls titled À l'état sauvage airs in the French on M6. It is hosted by Mike Horn and premiered on the network on June 28, 2016.

À L'État Sauvage
Six episodes aired between 2016 and 2018. In each episode, Horn brings a different celebrity along on his adventures. The following 6 French celebrities made their embarked on an adventure with Horn: Michael Youn, Matt Pokora, Laure Manaudou, Christophe Dechavanne, Shy'm and Adriana Karembeu. Each episode took place in different countries around the world: Namibia, Sri Lanka, Botswana, Venezuela and Nepal.

Cap Horn
After the six episodes of "À L'État Sauvage", Horn starts his own format of the show: "Cap Horn". So far, only two episodes have aired, featuring celebrities Arnaud Ducret and Bernard de La Villardière, whom he embarked on adventures with in the Philippines.

References

External links
 
 

English-language television shows
NBC original programming
National Geographic (American TV channel) original programming
2010s American reality television series
2020s American reality television series
2014 American television series debuts
Works about survival skills